The Altman Self-Rating Mania Scale (ASRM) is a 5-item self-reported diagnostic scale which can be used to assess the presence and severity manic and hypomanic symptoms, most commonly in patients diagnosed with bipolar disorder.

Effectiveness 
The ASRM scale has been shown to be an effective self-reported questionnaire for screening patients with acute mania as well as measuring anti-manic treatment effects. Though only a 5-question instrument, the scale's compatibility with the clinician administered Young Mania Rating Scale and the DSM-IV criteria give substantial diagnostic power for such a brief instrument.

Format 
The Altman Self-Rating Mania Scale assess differences in "normal" or baseline levels in five subjective and behavioral areas: 
 positive mood
 self-confidence 
 sleep patterns
 speech patterns and amount 
 motor activity

Each of these areas has five statements which correspond to scores 0 through 4; with 0 being unchanged from "normal" or baseline, to 4 being overtly manic thoughts or behavior. The subject is asked to choose one statement from each of the five areas that best describes the way they have been feeling over the past week.

Scoring 
Scores above a 5 are indicative of mania, or hypomania, with the severity of symptoms increasing with higher scores. Examining score changes over time is also used to determine the efficacy of a particular treatment in a clinical setting and to qualify whether the severity a manic episode is increasing or decreasing.

See also 
 Diagnostic classification and rating scales used in psychiatry
 Young Mania Rating Scale

References

External links 
Online version of the ASRM

Mania screening and assessment tools